The Animals Film is a 1981 feature documentary film about the use of animals by human beings, directed by Victor Schonfeld and Myriam Alaux, and narrated by actress Julie Christie.

Synopsis
The Animals Film presents a survey of the uses of animals in factory farming, as pets, for entertainment, in scientific and military research, hunting, etc. The film also profiles the international animal rights movement. The film incorporates secret government footage, cartoons, newsreels, and excerpts from propaganda films.

Release
The Animals Film was distributed in cinemas in Britain, Australia, Germany, Austria, Canada and the United States, and was broadcast on numerous television networks. The British network, Channel Four, transmitted the film during the Channel's third night on air in November 1982. It generated front-page news in Britain at the time because Channel 4 broadcast a two-hour version of the film shorn of seven minutes of its concluding sequence. The original 136 minute film released in cinemas had been approved with a 'AA' certificate and no cuts by the BBFC, but the Independent Broadcasting Authority instructed Channel 4 that certain scenes in the film could 'incite crime or lead to civil disorder.' Jonathon Porritt and David Winner write that, with over one million viewers, the screening is regarded as "an important moment in the growth of public awareness of animal exploitation." Channel Four screened it again during its Banned series in 1991.

Home media
In 2007 a DVD of The Animals Film was released with a new director's cut (running time 120 minutes), via Beyond the Frame. In 2008 the British Film Institute released a remastered DVD in the UK, incorporating both the original uncensored cinema version and the director's cut.

Reception
Alan Brien, film critic of the UK Sunday Times, wrote of the film: "The most impressive film maudit, possibly too hot to handle... stuffed with footage never before shown, and a wealth of newly-shot material often taken undercover, which documents... mankind's degradation, exploitation, and often pointless torture, of the creatures who share our planet. ...Proves, beyond contradiction, that this behaviour is not just random or personal but part of our organised society, with drug companies, government departments, scientists, military authorities, factory farmers, university research laboratories, for their own selfish ends, for profit in money or prestige. I do not know when I have come out of a screening so moved by the power of the cinema as a medium to transform the entire sensibility of an audience."

British singer-songwriter Elvis Costello says he was moved to reject meat after seeing the film.

In 2010 the BBC World Service broadcast One Planet: Animals & Us, a radio documentary series in which Victor Schonfeld investigates why little has changed since the making of The Animals Film.

Soundtrack

Robert Wyatt composed an original soundtrack for the film, released in 1982 on Rough Trade Records. The film also features music from Talking Heads and ex-Audience frontman, Howard Werth. Critical reception of the soundtrack was mixed. Ted Mills of album database Allmusic described the soundtrack as "moody" and filled with "tasty-sounding analog synths from the late '70s", but ultimately it "disappoint[s] fans of Wyatt's vocals." It was later issued in a heavily edited form (losing more than 10 minutes, with no explanation given) as a Japanese CD, and all later CD reissues have been cloned from this master.

See also
List of vegan media
Earthlings, 2006
Behind the Mask, 2006

References

External links
 Beyond the Frame DVD
 British Film Institute DVD
 BBC World Service 'One Planet: Animals & Us'
 "Shock and Awe" by Victor Schonfeld – The Guardian, 5 July 2007
 "They Are What You Eat" by Julie Christie – The Guardian, 26 September 2008
 "Fancy a Roast this Sunday? First Watch The Animals Film" by Ken Russell – The Times, 30 September 2008
 

Documentary films about animal rights
1981 films
1981 documentary films
British documentary films
Documentary films about vegetarianism
1980s English-language films
1980s British films